Radek Šírl (born 20 March 1981) is a Czech former professional footballer who played as a left midfielder or left-back.

Career

Club

Šírl was born in Rudná.

Šírl and Zenit St. Petersburg agreed to the mutual termination of his contract on 7 September 2010. A few days later, Šírl signed a two-year contract with Mladá Boleslav.

Career statistics

Club
Source:

International
Source:

Honours
Zenit Saint Petersburg
 Russian Premier League Cup: 2003
 Russian Premier League: 2007
 Russian Super Cup: 2008
 UEFA Cup: 2008
 UEFA Super Cup: 2008
 Russian Cup: 2010

Mladá Boleslav
 Czech Cup: 2011

References

External links
 
 Profile at iDNES.cz 
 Profile at the official FC Zenit St. Petersburg website 
 

1981 births
Living people
People from Prague-West District
Czech footballers
Czech Republic youth international footballers
Czech Republic under-21 international footballers
Czech Republic international footballers
Czech expatriate footballers
Association football defenders
Association football midfielders
Bohemians 1905 players
AC Sparta Prague players
FC Zenit Saint Petersburg players
UEFA Cup winning players
FK Mladá Boleslav players
Expatriate footballers in Russia
Russian Premier League players
Czech First League players
Czech expatriate sportspeople in Russia
Sportspeople from the Central Bohemian Region